Ozidi is a folk hero among the Ijo of Nigeria, and the subject of The Ozidi Saga.

A Series Of Excerpts From The Oral Records Of The Ijo People

References 
Miller, Eric (1998). Roleplaying in an African Storytelling Event.

Nigerian culture